ScienceLogic is a software and service vendor. It produces information technology (IT) management and monitoring software for IT Operations and cloud computing.

Product 

The company's flagship product, SL1, is a singular infrastructure monitoring and AIOps platform that provides operations teams with actionable insights to predict, detect, and resolve IT problems faster. It works by performing discovery, dependency mapping, monitoring, alerting, ticketing, workflow automation, dashboarding, and reporting for the cloud, networks, compute, storage, and applications.

The ScienceLogic SL1 platform monitors both on-premises and cloud-based IT assets, enabling customers who use public cloud services, such as Amazon Web Services (AWS), Microsoft Azure, and Google Cloud to manage hybrid and multi-cloud workloads. SL1 deployment models support on-premises and SaaS-based options.

History 

ScienceLogic was founded in Reston, Virginia, in 2003 by David Link, Christopher Cordray, and Richard Chart. The company tripled its revenue growth year-over year, and had triple digit growth from 2005-2007.

In 2008, ScienceLogic posted $5.9M in revenue. That same year, Inc. Magazine placed ScienceLogic on its annual list of America's 500 Fastest Growing Private Companies at #350, also including it as #42 in the Top 100 IT Services Companies. In 2009, the company's position on the list was #490.

In 2010, ScienceLogic received $15 million in Series A funding from New Enterprise Associates. Two years later, ScienceLogic raised an additional $15 million in funding from Intel Capital. In 2015, ScienceLogic received $43 million in Series D funding, led by Goldman Sachs In 2016, ScienceLogic announced the acquisition of AppFirst.

Following the launch of the SL1 product line in 2018, which by the company and its partners said was the industry's first context-infused AIOps platform, ScienceLogic received $25 million in growth financing from Square 1 Bank.

In 2020, ScienceLogic updated its platform to include behavioral correlation, an artificial intelligence/machine learning approach for IT in diagnosing and remediating service disruptions.

Reception 

 ScienceLogic ranked on Deloitte’s Technology Fast 500™ Deloitte Technology Fast 500 in 2009, 2016, and 2018.
 ScienceLogic was recognized by Forrester as a leader in “The Forrester Wave™: Intelligent Application and Service Monitoring, Q2 2019.”
 In 2019, ScienceLogic was named the #3 AIOps global vendor by Research in Action.
 In 2020, ScienceLogic was named one of the “20 Coolest Cloud Management and Migration Companies of the 2020 Cloud 100.”
 In 2020, ScienceLogic earned two “Top Rated Awards” from TrustRadius for System Monitoring and IT Infrastructure Monitoring.
 In Q4 of 2020, ScienceLogic was named an AIOps leader in The Forrester Wave: Artificial Intelligence for IT Operations category. 
 In September of 2020, Enterprise Management Associates (EMA) released its AIOps Radar Report, naming ScienceLogic SL1 a leader in AIOps. 
 In December 2020, ScienceLogic celebrated its fourth achievement as an NVTC Tech 100 Honoree.
 In January 2021, ScienceLogic kicked off the year with a hiring blitz and plans for expansion. 
 In February 2021, ScienceLogic raised $105 million in Series E funding. 
 In June 2021, ScienceLogic opened its Taiwan headquarters to further support its international customer base. 
 In January 2022, ScienceLogic hired nearly 200 people in the coming months—boosting ranks again after a 30% headcount increase last year—to support investments in revenue teams, customer success, global expansion, and product development. 
 In September 2021, ScienceLogic acquired the network configuration and change management vendor, Restorepoint. 
 In May 2022, ScienceLogic earned eight 2022 TrustRadius Top Rated Awards in the AIOps, Application Performance Management (APM), Event Monitoring, IT Infrastructure Monitoring, IT Operations Analytics, Network Monitoring, Observability, and System Monitoring software categories.

References 

Network management
Network analyzers
System administration